Etnograficheskoe Obozrenie is a peer-reviewed academic journal covering "the study of peoples and cultures of the world". It is published by the N.N. Miklukho-Maklai Institute of Ethnology and Anthropology (Russian Academy of Sciences).

Abstracting and indexing
The journal is abstracted and indexed in:
Anthropological Literature
EBSCO databases
ERIH PLUS
FRANCIS
Index Islamicus
International Bibliography of the Social Sciences
Modern Language Association Database
Russian Science Citation Index
Scopus

History
The journal was established in 1889. Its publication, however, was suspended between 1916 and 1926 "due to the turmoil of the revolutionary era" but was resumed in 1926 under the new name Этнография (Etnografia) which was again changed to Советская Этнография (Sovetskaia Etnografia) in 1931. Its name was reverted to the initial title, Etnograficheskoe Obozrenie, in 1991 after the dissolution of the Soviet Union.

Editors-in-chief
The following persons are or have been editor-in-chief:
Sergey Valeryevich Sokolovskiy (present)
Julia Pavlovna Petrova-Averkieva (1966–October 1980)
Sergey Pavlovich Tolstov (1946–1966)
Nikolay Mikhaylovich Matorin (1931–December 1934)
Sergey Fyodorovich Oldenburg (1926–1931)

References

External links

Publications established in 1889
Anthropology journals
Russian Academy of Sciences academic journals
Russian-language journals
Bimonthly journals